Student housing at the University of California, Irvine is separated between freshmen, continuing students, graduate students, and faculty. These accommodations serve a traditional purpose of housing residents, but also serve as a long-term outreach incentive for new freshmen and faculty. Student housing also play a key role in developing campuswide social activities.

Freshmen

Accommodations
Freshmen are typically assigned to live in either Middle Earth or Mesa Court; each residence hall is managed by a student Resident Advisor. Freshmen are no longer assigned to Arroyo Vista which accommodates continuing students in special theme houses, with the exception of those who are enrolled in the Campuswide Honors Program.

Because of increasing enrollment in recent years, on-campus housing is only guaranteed for freshmen and transfer students. As of 2006, freshmen may take advantage of a two-year university housing guarantee. Furthermore, all freshmen receive academic advising, introductory university seminars, and freshmen-only activities through UCI's new First Year Initiative.

Built in 1965, Mesa Court was the first housing complex established at UCI. Middle Earth started out with seven halls: Hobbiton, Isengard, Lorien, Mirkwood, Misty Mountain, Rivendell, and The Shire. Phase II later opened in 1989-1990 with additional thirteen halls: Balin, Harrowdale, Whispering Wood, Woodhall, Calmindon, Grey Havens, Aldor, Rohan, Gondolin, Snowbourn, Elrond, Shadowfax, and Quenya, Lastly in Fall 2000, Crickhollow, Evenstar, Oakenshield, and Valimar were opened.  This contrasts with Mesa Court, which is built on expansive and hilly terrain (which sometimes deters non-essential travel) and located far from Ring Road and the central campus. Additionally, Mesa Court has a large number of high-volume residence halls on the far side of the campus, thus encouraging more socialization within specific dormitories themselves. However, each community has a distinct personality and pride all their own, with students identifying strongly with the community in which they reside. Additionally, it is not uncommon for students from both housing communities to intermingle and attend each other's events.

Both Mesa Court and Middle Earth offer general use dormitories alongside theme dormitories. Themes vary widely and include Campuswide Honors, leadership, diversity, LGBT issues, school-or major-specific programs, drug abstinence, and the like. Incoming freshmen usually have their choice of dormitory theme (or lack thereof), and residence in any given dormitory offers significant dividents for those who actively participate in theme events. The general theme for the dorms in Mesa Court is based on Spanish names such as Laguna, Niebla and Jardin. As for Middle Earth the general theme is based on the popular series The Lord of the Rings. Some dorm names include Crickhollow and Evenstar. In Mesa Court, the dorms are arranged in suites of four or five rooms and a study room which is shared by the suite. The dorms are usually two or three stories with about three suites on each floor. Middle Earth includes hall houses with 45 – 75 residents. Most rooms are double occupancy, but there are also triples in Phase II and Phase III halls. Quenya has 60 single rooms. The suites in the Middle Earth halls include about five - seven  rooms which may be single-sex or coed. Each room is furnished with beds, wardrobes, desks, bookcases, and chairs. Each hall has access to a small kitchen, laundry facilities, and a common room with a TV.

Middle Earth 

Middle Earth is a student housing complex at the University of California, Irvine that houses approximately 1,690 students in 24 residence halls. The names of the halls and other facilities were selected from J.R.R. Tolkien's legendarium.

Middle Earth is located along Ring Road, toward the core of the university's campus. The residence halls were built in three consecutive phases, beginning in 1974. The first phase was designed by William Pereira. The last phase was completed in the summer of 2019 and officially opened September 16, 2019; although reported in the media as being called the two towers of Middle Earth,  its two buildings are actually named Telperion and Laurelin, after the Two Trees of Valinor.

Dining services
Residents of Middle Earth and Mesa Court are required to choose and pay for a meal plan to complement their monthly rent expenses; voluntary meal plans are available to all other students and community members. These meal plans may be employed at one of many on-campus eateries such as Phoenix Grille, B.C.'s Cavern on the Green, and Bistro by the Bridge (through the use of debit ZotBucks), or in one of three dining halls.

The two main dining halls, Mesa Commons and Pippins Commons, are located in Mesa Court and Middle Earth, respectively. Middle Earth also has a second dining hall, Brandywine, which specializes in freshly prepared food and quick entrees. Most students at UCI prefer Pippins Commons and Brandywine over Mesa Commons. Even though Pippins Commons and Brandywine are across campus from Mesa Court, many Mesa residents find it a treat, worthy of their time, to walk to Pippins and Brandywine just to eat!  Thursday dinners are referred to as "premium night," a tradition that offers patrons particularly high-quality meals (with past meals including grilled steak and crab legs). Every month, both of the Commons host a special birthday event or theme dinner (with past themes promoting foods from Hawaii, China, Latin America, and so forth). The Commons are both open throughout the weekday and twice during the weekends (for brunch and dinner); Brandywine is generally closed on weekends and offers a more limited weekday schedule.

Other undergraduates
Non-freshmen undergraduates live in Campus Village, Vista del Campo, Vista del Campo Norte, Camino del Sol, Arroyo Vista, Puerta Del Sol, or in one of the many apartment complexes off-campus. Anteater Express offers complimentary shuttle bus service to and from the five communities mentioned. Campus Village, located off Ring Road next to the School of Biological Sciences, offers 200 two-bedroom university apartments housing four students each.  Residents of Campus Village are chosen and paired together via lottery. As an apartment complex, Campus Village uniquely employs active Resident Advisors (RAs).

Vista del Campo (or "VDC" for short), is a modern on-campus apartment managed and owned by American Campus Communities, a private firm. Nearby is Vista del Campo Norte (or "Norte" for short), an extension of VDC, which was completed in 2006. Across from Vista del Campo Norte is Camino del Sol, the newest phase of undergraduate student housing at UCI, which is also managed by American Campus Communities.  Camino del Sol will house its first residents in the Fall of 2010, and expects to house 1,198 students.  Camino del Sol differs from VDC and Vista del Campo Norte in that Camino del Sol are townhomes.  All three complexes have ultra-modern amenities such as swimming pools, private theaters, computer centers, and large recreation centers. They also employ Community Assistants (CAs) who manage the recreation centers and offer limited event planning.  An additional housing complex has been added to the group  of VDC, VDCN, and Camino named Puerta Del Sol.  Originally built for graduate students, just opened up to undergraduates in 2011.  Puerta Del Sol is built from the same company as Camino Del Sol and has similar features.

Arroyo Vista is a community of 42 "houses" accommodating 16, 24, or 32 residents each. These houses combine the setting of a family-style residence with the amenities of a dormitory, which leads to strong resident camaraderie and dynamic community relationship. Prospective Arroyo Vista residents must meet the academic requirements of each house and write essays as part of the application process. The houses themselves are divided between academic themes and Greek interests and will only accept Freshman residents, if there's an overflow of students that cannot fit into Mesa Court or Middle Earth. Academic theme houses are sponsored by a department or on-campus organization, and incorporate courses or events relevant to the house theme (e.g. Biology or Campuswide Honors). Greek houses are allocated to fraternities and sororities, and can be compared to the equivalent of a Greek Row. And recently, Arroyo Vista introduced an International Village, which will combine international students with undergraduates into four adjacent theme houses.

Social activities

Planning
All undergraduate student housing complexes at UC Irvine employ a two-tier structure for planning and implementing social activities. The first tier involves Resident Advisors (RAs) and House Assistants (HAs), whose responsibilities include planning social activities for their residents. These student staff members employ a housing budget to plan events that revolve around a housing theme (if it exists), an educational theme, a special event (such as a faculty lecture), and community development (social activities). RAs and HAs are required to host a set number of each aforementioned type of event each quarter; most often exceed this requirement. Many ad hoc and impromptu events are also organized and held outside of the housing office's requirements, making student staff relatively autonomous when implementing events. Accountability comes in the form of extensive paperwork documenting event descriptions, the number of participants, and all budgetary expenses.

The second tier involves Community Programmers (CPs) and housing office professional staff, who plan complex-wide events. These individuals are responsible for developing community-wide events to create cohesion amongst all residents, regardless of the building in which they live. These events usually employ larger budgets and bigger publicity efforts, and must also be held accountable for planning and expenses. These complex-wide events may either be held in the local community center, open space, or available dormitory. Additionally, CPs and the professional staff are required to host a set number of monthly events.

Residents of Vista del Campo rely upon Community Assistants (CAs), who are roughly analogous to Resident Advisors in Campus Village. However, CAs have far fewer responsibilities for social activities in comparison to student staff with UCI Student Housing. Additionally, specific dormitories or houses with special themes may have additional student staff on hand to plan events. For example, Sierra in Mesa Court employs Sierra Programmers (SPs) to articulate the dormitory's unique diversity theme, while the Campuswide Honors Program coordinates with its theme dormitories and theme houses for Campuswide Honors events.

Traditions
In addition to conducting hundreds of events every year, UCI Student Housing also retains many annual events that have become long-standing traditions. For instance, each housing complex offers a major dance every year. For Mesa Court and Middle Earth, these dances usually occur in the fall and are informal outings. In Arroyo Vista, the tradition is to host an annual semi-formal, with past events being hosted on a cruise ship and resort hotel. Another tradition is for Community Programmers to host a food delivery service during midterms and finals weeks. Residents may call the housing office to order food, which is then delivered to them for a fee. The income from this event is used to host large events throughout the year. Additional traditional events abound, with the list including a casino night, camping on the complex's open spaces, talent show, movie screenings, keynote professor lecture series, Halloween haunted house contest, and more.

Graduates and faculty
Graduate students are housed at the Verano Place, Palo Verde and Vista del Campo apartments. The first two cater to families as well as single students, and there are day care and child education facilities on campus. Both facilities, particularly Palo Verde, have undergone renovation and expansion to accommodate UCI's growing number of programs. These expanded facilities have led UCI to offer guaranteed housing to all incoming PhD and MFA students. Rather than the RA system many students are familiar with from undergraduate education, Verano and Palo Verde are led socially and politically by Residents' Councils. The expanded facilities and councils grew out of a number of protests, including the founding of a temporary graduate student tent city in the middle of Aldritch Park. Improved student governance helped to prevent later controversies such as the closure of Irine Meadows West and the introduction of undergraduates into graduate housing from similarly disrupting the campus.

Faculty members and postdoctoral researchers may opt to live in Las Lomas and University Hills, an on-campus apartment complex and planned housing community aimed at the university's research professionals. Las Lomas is at the foot of University Hills, with the former constructed in 1982 and the latter in 1986. Both share open community areas, a Montessori school, parks, and bike paths. The Thomas T. and Elizabeth C. Tierney University House, in which UCI's chancellor resides, is located at the top of University Hills.

During his first year as Vice Chancellor of Student Housing, Dr. Bill Zeller (replaced as Housing Director by Lisa Cornish, formerly responsible for Graduate Student Housing, in July 2008) lived on-campus in a Mesa Court freshman dormitory in order to experience on-campus housing from a student's perspective.

On April 19, 2010 a two-year moratorium on cats was instituted. New Graduate Housing residents were not allowed to have cats in their apartments. The moratorium has since been lifted.

Residents of the UC Irvine student family housing units (Palo Verde and Verano Place) are zoned to the Irvine Unified School District. Residents are zoned to Turtle Rock Elementary School, Vista Verde Middle School, and University High School.

Off campus
Since approximately 36% of UCI students reside on campus, the majority either live in the area and commute, or must seek housing in nearby off-campus apartments. UCI Student Housing maintains a housing search office and roommate pairing service in the Administration building. However, nearly all the apartment complexes in Irvine are managed by The Irvine Company (also true in nearby Newport Beach and Tustin to a lesser extent), allowing residents to consolidate their search through one organization. Apartments in this area of Orange County have a reputation for high monthly rent, which is often offset by sharing accommodations with many roommates.

One of the most popular off-campus housing locations for UCI students is Parkwest, which is located between Culver and University adjacent to the 405 freeway. Since hundreds of students live here, the ASUCI Express Shuttle devotes a fee-based bus line to servicing this apartment. Other locations notable for significant student populations include Berkeley/Columbia Court, Stanford Court, Harvard/Cornell Court, Dartmouth Court, Villa Sienna, and Turtle Rock, all of which are blocks away from the UCI campus.

Other notable off-campus housing locations include Balboa Peninsula and Balboa Island, which is particularly popular with fraternities and sororities. Additionally, the absence of a Greek Row at UCI has resulted in numerous Greek chapter houses being scattered across Irvine and Newport Beach.

Irvine Meadows West
UCI once hosted Irvine Meadows West (IM West), a trailer park community that offered accommodations for about 111 undergraduates and graduates. It offered the most affordable housing in Orange County close to UCI (at $130/month) and an eclectic membership of students and their pets (including dogs, cats, rabbits, and parrots). IM West was unique in student housing in that it offered its residents democratic participation in the management and maintenance of the trailer park. For example, residents governed monthly rental rates, constructed a community center, and collaborated on park improvement projects. Residents also planned their own events without the assistance of a resident advisor or manager from the student housing office.

On August 1, 2004, despite the vocal protests of its resident association, IM West was shut down after a five-year extension on its lease. UCI administrators decided to shut down the trailer park in order to build an extension to an adjacent parking lot between the School of Biological Sciences and School of Physical Sciences.

Before Irvine Meadows West (IMW) was created, students parked RVs in the hills around the campus, which was thought to interfere with the wildlife preserve (coyotes, rabbits, deer, turkey vultures, and mountain lions sometimes entered IMW, and wild artichokes and endangered California poppies (state flower) grew in the hills).  The illegal campers had no bathroom facilities or showers, so they were moved adjacent to the gymnasium.  Some of the earliest residents of IMW lived there before the IMW was created.

Residents, at one time, were eligible for the campus meal plan, but later were excluded.

References

External links

UCI Student Housing (undergraduate and graduate accommodations)
Irvine Campus Housing Authority (faculty accommodations)

Student Housing
California, Irvine, University of